Pacific Park is an oceanfront amusement park located in Santa Monica, California.
The park, located on the Santa Monica Pier, looks directly out on the Pacific Ocean, in the direction of Catalina Island. It is the only amusement park directly located on the West Coast of the United States located on a pier and LA's only admission-free park. There are a total of thirteen rides in Pacific Park, including the world's first and only solar powered Ferris wheel that provides a view of the Pacific Ocean and a roller coaster that circles the majority of the park. Pacific Park is also home to 14 midway games and over-the-ocean food and retail outlets. It has appeared in over 500 movies and television shows such as Fat Albert, Hannah Montana, Hannah Montana: The Movie, Kidsongs, 90210, Bean, and The Tonight Show with Jay Leno, as well as the popular video game Grand Theft Auto V. In 2020, it featured in the opening ident for the sky television channel Sky Comedy. It is operated by Premier Parks LLC.

History
Santa Monica Municipal Pier opened in 1909; it was primarily to carry sewer pipes out beyond the breakers and had no amenities. In 1916 Charles I. D. Looff, who built Coney Island's first carousel, started construction on an adjacent pier known as the Pleasure Pier, also called Newcomb Pier, for use as an amusement park. The two piers are now both considered to be part of Santa Monica Pier. Attractions on the Pleasure Pier eventually included the Santa Monica Looff Hippodrome building (which now houses the current carousel and is listed on the National Register of Historic Places), the Blue Streak Racer wooden roller coaster (which was purchased from the defunct Wonderland amusement park in San Diego), the Whip, merry-go-rounds, Wurlitzer organs, and a funhouse. The Pleasure Pier thrived during the 1920s but faded during the Great Depression. During the 1930s, the pier was mainly used as a ferry landing, while most of the pier was closed down and its attractions sold off.

Over the next several decades the city of Santa Monica proposed various plans to tear down Newcomb Pier. The city council approved a plan to replace the pier with a resort island in Santa Monica Bay. Local activists formed Save Santa Monica Bay and shot down that plan, and in 1973, the city formally revoked a standing order to demolish the pier. The city acquired ownership of the privately owned pier in summer 1974. In the 1980s, the pier was almost destroyed by winter storms. In 1983, the city formed a Pier Restoration and Development Task Force (now the Pier Restoration Corporation), tasked with returning the pier to its former glory. Summer music concerts were held on the pier.

In 1989, the Pier Restoration Corporation decided to "make the pier a year-round commercial development with amusement rides, gift shops, nightclubs with live entertainment and restaurants" that would be "reminiscent of its heyday in the 1920s and 1930s". The current  park opened in 1996 as a full-scale family amusement park.

Rides and attractions

The park is "non-gated" and there is no charge for admission; individual rides charge a fee. There are thirteen rides as well as midway games, food outlets, and shopping. A Seaside Pavilion event space opened in 2009 for corporate and private events. This is a list of rides in operation at Pacific Park as of 2016.

Rollercoaster
Santa Monica West Coaster – A steel roller coaster running around the perimeter of Pacific Park.

Thrill rides
Inkie's Scrambler – A 12-car Scrambler, refurbished in 2013
Sea Dragon – A pirate ship with a 180° swing.
Pacific Plunge – A  drop tower built by Moser Rides. Carries 10 seated people in two gondolas. Refurbished in 2012
Shark Frenzy – A custom built shark-themed twist on a Tilt-a-whirl ride. Each seated shark "head" represents a different species of shark including the Blue, Bull, Great White, Lemon, Mako, Sand Tiger and Tiger species.

Family rides
Pacific Wheel – The original Pacific Wheel was listed on eBay with half the proceeds from the sale donated to the Special Olympics. It had 20 gondolas and was featured in the Steven Spielberg film 1941. Pacific Park claims that the Pacific Wheel is the world's first and only solar-powered Ferris wheel.
Sig Alert EV – A bumper car ride named for the traffic alert unique to California.

Children's rides
Inkie's Frog Hopper – A scaled-down 'bouncing' drop tower reaching 
Inkie's Wave Jumper
Inkie's Sea Planes
Inkie's Air Lift
Seaside Swing – Seats up to 16 guests on a two-sided bench that sways back and forth in a 45 degree arc.
Inkie's Sig Alert – Kiddie version of bumper cars.

Attraction, additional
Gyro Loop – Players use a joystick to control their speed and RPM while circling and rotating, in an attempt to win a prize.

Past rides and attractions
Chaos: removed and replaced by Inkie's Scrambler
Rock and Roll: removed for Chaos and later replaced by Inkie's Scrambler
Swing Ride: removed for Pirates Pier Mini-Golf and later replaced by Sig Alert EV
Inkie's Pirate Ship - Last day was in Q1 of 2017; removed and replaced by Shark Frenzy 
Pier Patrol – A 'train' of cars propelled around a beach-themed track. Removed and replaced by Seaside Swing
Pirates Pier Mini-Golf: removed and replaced by Sig Alert EV
Bumper Cars: removed and replaced by Inkie's Sea Planes and Inkie's Air Lift
Mini Pirate Ship
Lil' Scrambler
Baron Planes: removed and replaced by Inkie's Wave Jumper
Balloon Race
Turtles
Crazy Submarine: removed and replaced by Seaside Swing
Mini Swing Ride
Rock Climber
Bungee Jumper
Extraordinary Bike: removed and replaced by Gyro Loop

Gallery

Filming Films 
Bean (1997) (Amusement Simulator: It's Frightening!: Ride Of Doom – Volcano Mine Ride.)

Further reading

 (Pacpark.com)

References

External links

 Official Site of Pacific Park

Amusement parks in California
Parks in Los Angeles County, California
1996 establishments in California
Buildings and structures in Santa Monica, California
Tourist attractions in Santa Monica, California
Amusement parks opened in 1996
Premier Parks, LLC